In mathematics, Stieltjes–Wigert polynomials (named after Thomas Jan Stieltjes and Carl Severin Wigert) are a family of basic hypergeometric orthogonal polynomials in the basic Askey scheme, for the weight function 

on the positive real line x > 0.

The moment problem for the Stieltjes–Wigert polynomials is indeterminate; in other words, there are many other measures giving the same family of orthogonal polynomials (see Krein's condition).

Koekoek et al. (2010) give in Section 14.27 a detailed list of the properties of these polynomials.

Definition

The  polynomials are given in terms of basic hypergeometric functions and the Pochhammer symbol by

where

Orthogonality

Since the moment problem for these polynomials is indeterminate there are many different weight functions on [0,∞] for which they are orthogonal. 
Two examples of such weight functions are

and

Notes

References

Orthogonal polynomials
Special hypergeometric functions